Thomas and Jackie Hawks were a couple from Prescott, Arizona, United States, who were murdered in 2004. 

In April 2009, Skylar Julius Deleon and Jennifer Henderson were convicted of charges relating to their murders. Deleon was sentenced to death while Henderson was sentenced to two terms of life in prison without parole. Two other people, John Fitzgerald Kennedy and Alonso Machain, were convicted separately of the killings. Kennedy was sentenced to death, and Machain accepted a plea bargain after testifying for the prosecution in the trials of Deleon, Henderson, and Kennedy. He was sentenced to 20 years and four months in prison.

Disappearance
Thomas Hawks was a retired probation officer and bodybuilder. He and his second wife Jackie owned a 55-foot yacht, the Well Deserved, which they treated as their permanent home and on which they sailed for two years around the Pacific Ocean and the Gulf of California. In 2004, they decided to sell their yacht and set up a home in Newport Harbor to be closer to their grandchild. Jackie (née O'Neill) Hawks had helped raise Tom's sons from his first marriage since adolescence. When the wife of Hawks' older son was expecting their first child, Jackie treated the news as if it would be her natural grandchild.

Their advertisement for the yacht sale was answered in November by Skylar Deleon. The couple was initially cautious of Deleon, but they became more receptive when Deleon's then-pregnant wife Jennifer and their other child came to the meeting. The Hawks were last seen alive on the morning of November 15, 2004, heading out of the harbor. The yacht returned, but they did not. Neither body has ever been recovered.

Perpetrators

Skylar Preciosa Deleon (born John Julius Jacobson Jr. a.k.a. Skylar Julius Deleon) is a convicted murderer of three people. Deleon's gender was officially changed to female in 2019 while awaiting execution on death row.  Skylar Deleon claimed that she was a child actor who appeared in commercials and also claimed that at 14, she appeared in the series Mighty Morphin Power Rangers as an uncredited extra in the episode "Second Chance". However, casting sheets for that episode show no extras named "John Jacobson" (or with any similar name) as having appeared on the show.

At 20, Jacobson joined the United States Marine Corps, but deserted after 15 days ("went on Unauthorized Absence (UA)"). She was later given an other than honorable discharge.

Others involved 
 Jennifer Lynn Henderson (formerly Jennifer Deleon), wife of Skylar Deleon at the time of the murders. She was convicted of two counts of murder and sentenced to two terms of life in prison without the possibility of parole.
 Alonso Machain, former Seal Beach correctional officer who met Deleon while Deleon was serving time in prison for burglary.
 John Fitzgerald Kennedy, former Insane Crips gang member in Long Beach and former youth pastor, ex-convict for attempted murder, recruited the same day of the murder.
 Myron Sandora Gardner Sr., former Insane Crips gang member and ex-convict for involuntary manslaughter, who met Deleon at work after Deleon's release from prison, declined to participate in the crime but introduced Deleon to Kennedy.

Investigation 
Police inquired into the couple's disappearance. On November 26, 2004, an attempt was made to access the Hawks' bank account from Mexico. The family was notified and filed a missing-persons report with the Carlsbad, California police department.

On November 29, the police interviewed Skylar Deleon. She told them that she bought the boat from the Hawkses and showed them proof-of-purchase documents. She told police that the Hawkses left in their car with their money and named Alonso Machain as a witness to the purchase. Deleon claimed to have purchased the boat with the intent of laundering money related to an armed burglary in 2002 for which she had been convicted.

In March 2005, after initially fleeing to Mexico and returning, Machain confessed to the crime. He was arrested in connection with the couple's disappearance along with Deleon and Deleon's wife, Jennifer. Skylar Deleon initially maintained innocence, claiming they were not present at the time and speculated that the Hawkses were killed over a bad drug deal.

Trials 
Authorities alleged that during a sea trial of the boat in Newport Beach Harbor a few days after meeting the Hawkses, Deleon and accomplices Machain and Kennedy, bound and gagged the couple and threw them overboard, tied to the yacht's anchor. Deleon allegedly masterminded the plan to kill the couple for financial gain and enlisted Machain to help.

Deleon's then-wife, Jennifer ( Henderson), was found guilty on two counts of first-degree murder on November 17, 2006, after four hours of jury deliberation. In October 2007, Henderson was sentenced to two life terms without parole. She is currently housed at Central California Women's Facility in Chowchilla, California.

While awaiting trial in jail, Skylar Deleon was charged with soliciting another inmate to murder her cousin and father. Deleon was also accused of killing John Jarvi, a resident of Anaheim, California, who was found dead in Mexico in 2003. Deleon's father and cousin (who was charged as an accessory to the Jarvi murder) were considered "important witnesses" in both murder cases. On March 13, 2008, Deleon, who had been born male, partially severed her penis with a razor blade while being held in jail. After receiving medical attention, she was returned to jail the following day. In an interview with ABC's 20/20, Deleon indicated that she attempted to cut off her penis because she wanted to be a woman. Defense lawyers claimed that Deleon's need for money to finance sex reassignment surgery was the motivation for the Hawks' murders. In 2019, Deleon's gender was legally changed to female and Deleon's name is now Skylar Preciosa Deleon.

On September 22, 2008, jury selection began in the case against Deleon. In a consolidated case, Deleon was jointly tried for the murders of Thomas and Jackie Hawks and John Jarvi. Despite Deleon's earlier protestations of innocence, once the trial began, Deleon's attorney conceded that Deleon had indeed committed all three murders. The attorney said she had taken the case to trial only to argue to a jury that Deleon should not be sentenced to death. On October 20, Deleon was convicted of three counts of first-degree murder with special circumstances for financial gain and multiple victims and on November 6, 2008, the jury rendered a death verdict. Sentencing was originally scheduled for January 16, 2009, but was then rescheduled to March 20 on request by Deleon's attorney. On March 13, it was announced that sentencing would again be rescheduled, to April 10, so that the families of the victims could attend. On April 10, 2009, Deleon was sentenced to death by Orange County Superior Court Judge Frank Fasel. She is on death row at San Quentin State Prison.

On February 19, 2009, John Fitzgerald Kennedy was found guilty on two counts of first degree murder after fewer than three hours of jury deliberation. He was sentenced to death on May 1, 2009. Like Deleon, Kennedy is on death row at San Quentin State Prison.

Alonso Machain, after testifying against Deleon, Henderson, and Kennedy, pleaded guilty to two counts each of voluntary manslaughter, kidnapping, and robbery. On June 15, 2009, he was sentenced to 20 years and 4 months. He was first eligible for parole in September 2021. He is currently serving his sentence at Valley State Prison in Chowchilla, California.

In March 2009, after spending four years incarcerated, Myron Gardner pleaded guilty to "accessory after the fact" and the murder charges against him were dropped.

In the media
 This case was investigated on TV by Aphrodite Jones in her Investigation Discovery documentary TV series True Crime with Aphrodite Jones (Season 1, Episode 9) and was explored on the same network on two other programs: Wicked Attraction (episode "Calm Before the Storm") and Deadly Sins (episode "I'd Kill For A Sex Change").
 This case is referred to in a segment of the "Caffeine-Induced Aneurysm" episode of Robot Chicken.
 This case was investigated on TV on Oxygen on the TV show Snapped: Killer Couples, a spin-off of Snapped.
 The 48 Hours episode "Dark Voyage" covers this crime.
 The Demons in the City of Angels episode Child Actor Killer covers the case.
 This case is also covered in the podcast "Killafornia Dreaming: True Crime Tales from the Golden State; Episode 14, The Tale of Lost at Sea" - Google Play Podcasts.
 This case is briefly mentioned in the Podcast "Raised by TV" hosted by comedians Lauren Lapkus and Jon Gabrus in the episode "Mt. Crushmore."
 This case is covered on the TV show Crime Watch Daily with Chris Hansen, Season 2, Episode 165, "The Final Voyage."
 This case is mentioned in the podcast "My Favorite Murder" in Episode 169, "This Old Sandwich."
 This case was investigated on ABC 20/20 episode "Overboard."
 The case was the subject of an episode of HLN's How it Really Happened, "The Yacht Murder Mystery: Unspeakable Cruelty" (season 7, episode 5).

Further reading

See also 
 Capital punishment in California
 List of solved missing person cases

References

External links 
 

2000s missing person cases
2004 in California
2004 murders in the United States
Deaths by person in California
History of Orange County, California
Married couples
Missing person cases in California
Murder convictions without a body
Newport Beach, California
November 2004 events in the United States
Victims of serial killers